This article lists the squads for the 2014 FIFA U-20 Women's World Cup, held in Canada. Each competing federation was allowed a 21-player squad, which had to be submitted to FIFA.

Group A

Canada
Coach:  Andrew Olivieri

Ghana
Coach:  Bashir Hayford

Finland
Coach:  Marianne Miettinen

North Korea
Coach:  Hwang Yong-bong

Group B

Germany
Coach:  Maren Meinert

Melanie Leupolz sustained injury and was replaced by Joelle Wedemeyer.

United States
Coach:  Michelle French

China PR
Coach:  Wang Jun

Brazil
Coach:  Dorival Bueno

Group C

England
Coach:  Mo Marley

South Korea
Coach:

Mexico
Coach:  Christopher Cuéllar

Nigeria
Coach:  Peter Dedevbo

Group D

New Zealand
Coach:  Aaron McFarland

Paraguay
Coach:  Julio Gómez

France
Coach:  Gilles Eyquem

Costa Rica
Coach:  Garabet Avedissian

References

External links
FIFA U-20 Women's World Cup Canada 2014 – List of Players

2014 in youth association football
FIFA U-20 Women's World Cup squads